George Ward (February 23, 1932 – October 23, 2008) was a Canadian sprint canoeist who competed in the early 1950s. At the 1952 Summer Olympics in Helsinki, he was eliminated in the heats of the K-2 1000 m event.

References

George Ward's obituary

1932 births
2008 deaths
Canadian male canoeists
Canoeists at the 1952 Summer Olympics
Olympic canoeists of Canada